These are lists of New York City landmarks designated by the New York City Landmarks Preservation Commission:

 New York City Designated Landmarks in Manhattan:
 List of New York City Designated Landmarks in Manhattan below 14th Street
 List of New York City Designated Landmarks in Manhattan from 14th to 59th Streets
 List of New York City Designated Landmarks in Manhattan from 59th to 110th Streets
 List of New York City Designated Landmarks in Manhattan above 110th Street
 List of New York City Designated Landmarks in Manhattan on smaller islands
 List of New York City Designated Landmarks in Brooklyn
 List of New York City Designated Landmarks in Queens
 List of New York City Designated Landmarks in the Bronx
 List of New York City Designated Landmarks in Staten Island

See also
List of National Historic Landmarks in New York City
National Register of Historic Places listings in New York County, New York
 National Register of Historic Places listings in Manhattan below 14th Street
 National Register of Historic Places listings in Manhattan from 14th to 59th Streets
 National Register of Historic Places listings in Manhattan from 59th to 110th Streets
 National Register of Historic Places listings in Manhattan above 110th Street
 National Register of Historic Places listings in Manhattan on islands
National Register of Historic Places listings in Kings County, New York
National Register of Historic Places listings in Queens County, New York
National Register of Historic Places listings in Bronx County, New York
National Register of Historic Places listings in Richmond County, New York

External links
NYC Landmarks Preservation Commission
New York City Landmarks Preservation Commission Flickr group